Vinda was an Ancient city and bishopric in North Africa and is now a Latin Catholic titular see.

History 
Vinda was a city in the Roman province of Africa proconsularis, near modern Henchir-Bandou in present Tunisia.

It was important enough to become a suffragan bishopric of the Metropolitan in the provincial capital, Carthage.

Titular see 
The diocese was nominally restored in 1928 as a Latin Catholic titular see.

It has had the following incumbents, both of the lowest (episcopal) and intermediary (archiepiscopal) ranks :
 Titular Bishop Edgard Aristide Maranta, Capuchin Friars Minor (O.F.M. Cap.) (1930.03.27 – 1953.03.25), Apostolic Vicar of Dar-es-Salaam (Tanzania) (1930.03.27 – 1953.03.25), later promoted Metropolitan Archbishop of Dar-es-Salaam (Tanzania) (1953.03.25 – 1968.12.19), also Apostolic Administrator of Zanzibar and Pemba (Tanzania) (1964.12.12 – 1966), later Titular Archbishop of Castro (1968.12.19 – 1975.01.29)
 Titular Bishop Jean-Marie Villot (1954.09.02 – 1959.12.17), Auxiliary Bishop of Paris (France) (1954.09.02 – 1959.12.17), Titular Archbishop of Bosporus (1959.12.17 – 1965.01.17), Coadjutor Archbishop of Lyon (France) (1959.12.17 – 1965.01.17), succeeding as Metropolitan Archbishop of Lyon (1965.01.17 – 1967.04.07), Undersecretary of the Central Commission for the Coordination of the Postconciliar Work and the Interpretation of Conciliar Resolutions (1962 – 1965.01.17), Cardinal-Priest of SS. Trinità al Monte Pincio (1965.02.25 – 1974.12.12), Prefect of Sacred Congregation for Clergy (1967.04.07 – 1969.04.23), President of the Pontifical Commission for the Vatican City State (1969 – 1979.03.09), Papal Secretary of State of the Papal Secretariat of State (1969.05.02 – 1979.03.09), Prefect of the Council for the Public Affairs of the Church (1969.05.02 – 1979.03.09), President of the Administration of the Patrimony of the Apostolic See (1969.05.02 – 1979.03.09), Cardinal Protector of the Pontifical Ecclesiastical Academy (1969.05.02 – 1979.03.09), Chamberlain of the Holy Roman Church of Apostolic Camera (1970.10.16 – 1979.03.09), President of the Pontifical Council Cor Unum (1971.07.15 – 1978.09.04), Cardinal-Bishop of Frascati (1974.12.12 – 1979.03.09)
 Titular Bishop Eduardo Tomás Boza Masvidal (1960.03.31 – 2003.03.16)
 Titular Bishop Francesco Beschi (2003.03.25 – 2009.01.22)
 Titular Archbishop Franco Coppola  (2009.07.16 – ...), Apostolic Nuncio (papal ambassador) to Chad and to the Central African Republic

References

External links 
 GigaCatolic with titular incumbent biography links

Catholic titular sees in Africa
Former Roman Catholic dioceses in Africa